Dusted is the third studio album by New York City noise rock band Live Skull, released in 1987 by Homestead Records.

Accolades

Track listing

Personnel 
Adapted from the Dusted liner notes.

Live Skull
Mark C. – guitar, vocals, photography
Marnie Greenholz – bass guitar, vocals
Richard Hutchins– drums
James Lo – drums
Tom Paine – guitar, vocals
Thalia Zedek – vocals

Production and additional personnel
Martin Bisi – mixing
Live Skull – production, mixing

Release history

References

External links 
 

1987 albums
Homestead Records albums
Live Skull albums